Ulrik Huber (13 March 1636 in Dokkum – 8 November 1694 in Franeker), also known as Ulrich Huber or Ulricus Huber, was a professor of law at the University of Franeker and a political philosopher.

Huber studied in Franeker, Utrecht and Heidelberg. He started in 1657 – at a very young age – as professor of Eloquence and History at the University of Franeker and as of 1665 he became professor of law. From 1679 to 1682 he was a judge at the Court of Appeal of Friesland and thereafter returned his position as professor of law until his death in 1694.

His major work, was published initially in 1672 and continued to be revised until 1694. Huber considered captivity in war, criminal conviction, voluntary renunciation of liberty, and birth from a female slave legal grounds for slavery. Apart from this work, he was internationally well-known for his studies on Roman law. In the Netherlands he is also well known for his work  (1686, 1768) (The Jurisprudence of My Time). In this work he presents a complete overview of the law system of Friesland at that time. In 1672 he became engaged in the public polemic about the Frisian constitution then raging in and around the States of Friesland with his pamphlet  (Mirror of Appeal and Reform, concerning the current situation of the Fatherland).

Huber's short treatise on the conflict of laws, was a highly influential work, with a large impact on conflict of laws in English and American jurisprudence.

He is considered the greatest jurist of the Dutch province Friesland ever known. At the University of Groningen, one of the institutes of the Faculty of Law is named after him.

References

An introduction to Roman-Dutch law by R. W. Lee

External links
Ulrik Huber Institute

1636 births
1694 deaths
17th-century Latin-language writers
17th-century Dutch lawyers
17th-century Dutch philosophers
People from Dokkum
Academic staff of the University of Franeker
Conflict of laws scholars